Fahad Al-Saqri (born 11 October 1989) is a Saudi footballer who plays as a winger.

External links 
 

Living people
1989 births
Saudi Arabian footballers
Association football wingers
Al-Tai FC players
Al-Faisaly FC players
Al-Arabi SC (Saudi Arabia) players
Al-Shoulla FC players
Al-Lewaa Club players
Saudi Professional League players
Saudi First Division League players
Saudi Second Division players